Frank Gilliam may refer to:
 Frank Gilliam (American football)
 Frank Gilliam (politician)